Seluwasan is an Austronesian language of Yamdena, in the Maluku Islands of Indonesia. It is not close to Selaru. The Makatian dialect is distinct.

References

Central Malayo-Polynesian languages
Languages of the Maluku Islands